Konstantin Mikhailovich Genich (born 3 January 1978) is a former Russian professional football player. Currently he is a TV football commentator and expert of the Bookmaker Ratings.

Club career
He made his Russian Football National League debut for FC Khimki on 7 April 2001 in a game against FC Shinnik Yaroslavl. He played 3 seasons in the FNL for Khimki and FC Amkar Perm.

TV career 
In 2006, started his career as a journalist and sportscaster in NTV Plus Sport channel and worked until 2015. Then moved to MatchTV channel as television football commentator and  expert in Russian and Spanish football.

Honours
 Russian Second Division Zone Center top scorer: 2000 (18 goals)

References

External links
 

1978 births
Living people
Russian footballers
Russian expatriate footballers
Expatriate footballers in Latvia
Expatriate footballers in Israel
FK Ventspils players
FC Khimki players
Maccabi Ahi Nazareth F.C. players
FC Amkar Perm players
Association football commentators
Russian expatriate sportspeople in Latvia
Russian association football commentators
Association football midfielders
FC Spartak-2 Moscow players